Kaburakia is a genus of flatworms belonging to the family Callioplanidae.

The species of this genus are found in Northern America.

Species:

Kaburakia excelsa 
Kaburakia oceanica

References

Platyhelminthes